Alov Kandi (also Romanized as ‘Alov Kandī) is a village in Sarajuy-ye Shomali Rural District, in the Central District of Maragheh County, East Azerbaijan Province, Iran. At the 2006 census, its population was 17, in 5 families.

References 

Towns and villages in Maragheh County